This is a list of shopping malls in Kuwait, ordered by governorates:

Al-Ahmadi Governorate
Fahaheel 
 Al Kout Mall
 Fahahaheel Bazaar 

Abu Halifa
 Magic Mall

Egaila
 89 Mall
 Arabia Mall
 Awtad Mall
 Bairaq Mall
 The Gate Mall
 Liwan mall
 Sama Mall

Mangaf 
 Azeeziya Mall

Al Asimah Governorate
Kuwait City 
 Assima Mall
 Al Hamra Tower 
 Discovery mall (mainly for kids' stores and games)
 Al-Awqaaf Complex
 SM City Kuwait (soon to be under construction)
 Mubarakiya
 Al Tijaria Tower 

Sharq 
Behbehani Complex
 Souq Sharq

Mubarak Al Kabeer Governorate
Fnaitees
 The Lake
 The Port
 The Village

Al-Jahra Governorate
Al Jahra
 Al Alamia Mall
 Awtad Mall
 JAHRA Mall
 Al Manar Mall
 Qaser Al Sultan
 Sahari Mall
 Saleel Al Jahra
 Wara Complex

Al Farwaniya Governorate
Alrai
 The Avenues

Farwaniya
 Fahad Ghesham AlBasman Complex
 Metro Complex
 Magatheer Mall

North Khaitan
 Trio Mall

South Khaitan
 Al Rajaan Complex

Dajeej
 Tala Mall
 Waha Mall
 Basma Center
 Boubyan Complex
Shuwaikh Industrial
 Manara Mall
 Al Tilal Mall
 Al Hayat Commercial Complex
 Design District Kuwait | Premium Lifestyle Shopping Center, Shuwaikh
 Shuwaikh Market Mall
 CDC Mall
 Shuwaikh 125 Mall
Jleeb Al-Shuyoukh
 Souk Al Jaleeb

Hawali Governorate
Hawali
 Al Mohalab Mall
 Alrehab Complex (for gaming stores)
 Al Bahar Center
 Al Rifaei Complex
 Al Sumait Plaza
 eMall
 The Promenade Mall

Salmiya 
 Al Salam Mall
 The Cube Mall
 Marina Mall
 Salmiya Souq
 Al Fanar Mall
 Central Plaza
 Al Munira Complex
 Dana Center
 Laila Gallery
 Boulevard Mall
 Galleria 2000
 Al Bustan Mall
 Wataniya Complex
 Zahra Complex
 Olympia Mall
 The View Mall
 Thuraya Mall

Zahra 
 360 Mall
 Zahra Complex

References

List of Shopping Malls in Kuwait